The consolidation of Sweden involved an extensive process during which the loosely organized social system consolidated under the power of the king. The actual age of the Swedish kingdom is unknown. Also, for various reasons, scholars differ in defining early Sweden as either a country, state or kingdom.

Unlike the histories of Denmark and Norway, there is no agreement on a reliable date for a unified Sweden.  Historians judge differently the sources for the history of Sweden's consolidation.  The earliest history blends with Norse mythology. Early primary sources are foreign; secondary sources were written at a later date.

Older sources 
Based on the origins of the name of the kingdom as meaning (Kingdom of the Swedes), some historians have argued that Sweden was unified when the Swedes first solidified their control over the regions they were living in. The earliest date for this is based on a brief section in the Roman historian Tacitus discussing the Suiones tribe. 
This would imply that a Swedish kingdom would have existed in the first to second centuries AD. However, with the increased rigour of historical method advanced in 20th century historical research, in Sweden as elsewhere, historians such as Curt Weibull and his brother Lauritz maintained that these perspectives have become obsolete.  Modern historians noted that a millennium had passed between Tacitus and more in-depth and reliable documented accounts (or notices of contemporary events relating to Sweden by Frankish and German writers) of Swedish history. The work of Birger Nerman (1925), who argued that Sweden held a senior rank among the existing European states at the time represents a nationalist reaction to the academic historiography, with the latter taking a critical or cautious view of the value of old layers of sources of history especially if these documents and traditions are unsupported by any direct traces, any footprint of events and social or political conditions in the archaeological records, buildings, coinage etc. of the age in question.

Geats-Swedes arguments 
The names Swedes and Geats are attested in the Old English poems Beowulf (written down in the 11th century) and Widsith (from the 8th century) and building on older legendary and folklore material collected in England. In both poems, an Ongentheow (corresponding to  Angantyr in Icelandic sagas) is named as the King of the Swedes, and the Geats are mentioned as a separate people. These names of peoples living in present-day Sweden, the Anglo-Saxon references and now lost tales they were attached to must have travelled across the North Sea. The first time the two peoples are documented to have had a common ruler is during the reign of Olof Skötkonung about AD 1000. "Olof Skötkonung brukar anföras som den förste kung som med säkerhet kan sägas ha regerat över såväl Svealand som Götaland.", "Olof Skötkonung is usually given as the first king that we know for sure ruled over both Svealand and Götaland".

Timeframe arguments 
Rather than the unification of tribes under one king, others maintain that the process of consolidation was gradual. Nineteenth-century scholars saw the unification as a result of a series of wars based on evidence from the Norse sagas. For example, according to the Norwegian Historia Norwegiae and the Icelandic historian Snorri Sturlusson, a 7th-century king called Ingjald illråde burnt a number of subordinate kings to death inside his hall, thus abolishing the petty kingdoms in the consolidation of Sweden.

According to Sverre Bagge, unification in Sweden centered on controlling the areas around the major lakes in Sweden.

See also 
 Sweden proper
 History of Scandinavia
 Early Swedish history
 Götaland theory

Notes

References 
 
 
 
 
 
 
 
 

States and territories disestablished in the 1000s
Medieval Sweden
Sweden
Geographic history of Sweden
Political history of Sweden
Barbarian kingdoms